Josef Gumpold (3 September 1908 – 6 December 1942) was a German skier. He competed in the Nordic combined event at the 1936 Winter Olympics. He was killed in action during World War II.

References

1908 births
1942 deaths
German male Nordic combined skiers
Olympic Nordic combined skiers of Germany
Nordic combined skiers at the 1936 Winter Olympics
People from St. Johann im Pongau District
Austrian military personnel killed in World War II